Experimental Physiology is a monthly peer-reviewed scientific journal published by Wiley-Blackwell on behalf of The Physiological Society. According to the Journal Citation Reports, its 2020 impact factor is 2.969  It covers all areas of physiology, especially work that deals with both physiological and pathophysiological questions that investigate gene/protein function using molecular, cellular, and whole-animal approaches. All articles become freely accessible 12 months after publication. The editor-in-chief is Mike Tipton (Portsmouth, United Kingdom).

The journal publishes themed special issues. An annual prize is awarded to an early-career scientist who authors the best eligible paper in the journal.

History
The journal was established by Edward Sharpey-Schafer in 1908, under the title of Quarterly Journal of Experimental Physiology. In 1981, The Physiological Society took over its management. It changed to the present title in 1990, after some time being published six times a year. Previous editors in chief, or Chairman of the Editorial Board, include:
 John H. Coote: 2000-2006

References

External links

Publications established in 1908
Monthly journals
Wiley-Blackwell academic journals
English-language journals
Physiology journals
Academic journals associated with learned and professional societies